The Great Edinburgh Run was an annual ten-mile road running event which took place in the city centre of Edinburgh in Scotland. The last event was in April 2017 and the organiser have no plans to reinstate the event at present. Part of the Great Run series of competitions, it was formerly a 10 km event, switching to the ten-mile distance in 2014.

The event was first held in 1993 under the title of the Great Caledonian Run. The race was moved from Edinburgh to the Balmoral estate in Aberdeenshire in 1998 and was hosted there for seven years as part of the Balmoral Road Races, a collection of race from 3 km to 10 km. The Caledonian run became more of a national level competition in its stint in Balmoral as the 5-mile race. The race in Balmoral was voted as the nation's most scenic run by Runner's World magazine in 2004. The competition was financially supported by Scottish Enterprise Grampian in a partnership to promote tourism in north-east Scotland, but after the BBC decided to stop televising the event the decision was made for it to return to Edinburgh in 2005. During the seven-year period that the run was not held in the city, a separate and unrelated competition was held there under the title of the Capital City Challenge 10K. The Great Edinburgh Run acquired its current title in 2006.

Since 2005 the Great Edinburgh Run has been held on a course within the city centre. Starting in Holyrood Park, runners would see a number of the city's famous landmarks such as Edinburgh Castle, Greyfriars Bobby, Scott Monument and Arthur's Seat.

The men's course record for the 10 km (28:03 minutes) was set by Martin Mathathi in 2011, while Florence Kiplagat is the women's course record holder with her time of 32:10 minutes from 2010. At the second edition in 1994, amateur runner Dave Lewis won the men's race ahead of Olympians John Treacy and Gary Staines.

Past winners
Key:

References

List of winners from 2005 onwards
Great Edinburgh Run: Race History. Great Run. Retrieved on 2011-10-02.

External links
Official webpage

Athletics competitions in Scotland
International sports competitions in Edinburgh
Recurring sporting events established in 1993
1993 establishments in Scotland
Annual events in Edinburgh
Annual sporting events in the United Kingdom
Autumn events in Scotland